Morrie Elliott (born 2 October 1935) is a former  Australian rules footballer who played with South Melbourne in the Victorian Football League (VFL).

Notes

External links 

Living people
1935 births
Australian rules footballers from Victoria (Australia)
Sydney Swans players
Seymour Football Club players